Orthogonius foveiclypeus is a species of ground beetle in the subfamily Orthogoniinae. It was described by Tian & Deuve in 2004.

References

foveiclypeus
Beetles described in 2004